Michael Carbone is an American politician and Republican member of the Arizona House of Representatives elected to represent District 25 in 2022.

Early life
A native of Illinois, Carbone was born into an abusive environment, eventually being adopted by his grandparents. As an adult, he was involved with conservative politics while in Illinois, and later moved to Arizona to raise his family.

Elections
2022 Carbone and Tim Dunn won the Republican primary for Legislative District 25, defeating incumbent State Representative Joel John. They were unchallenged in the general election.

References

External links
 Biography at Ballotpedia

Republican Party members of the Arizona House of Representatives
Living people
Year of birth missing (living people)
21st-century American politicians